Tye River is an unincorporated community in Nelson County, Virginia, United States.

References
GNIS reference

Unincorporated communities in Nelson County, Virginia
Unincorporated communities in Virginia